Raseiniai District Municipality is one of 60 municipalities in Lithuania.

Symbols

Coat of arms: A traditional Iberic shield Argent, resting on a base Vert a lynx salient Proper.

References

 
Municipalities of Kaunas County
Municipalities of Lithuania